The Ogwen Group is an Ordovician lithostratigraphic group (a sequence of rock strata) in Gwynedd, north-west Wales. The name is derived from Ogwen Valley, a locality in Snowdonia where it outcrops.

Outcrops
The rocks occur throughout Llŷn and eastwards into Snowdonia within Gwynedd.

Lithology and stratigraphy
The Group consists of about 1000 m thickness (in the Pwllheli area) of mudstones and siltstones with some basal sandstones together with tuffs and oolitic ironstones laid down during the Arenig and Caradoc epochs of the Ordovician Period. The Nant Ffrancon subgroup alone exceeds 2km thickness in central Snowdonia. The subgroup as itself been classed as both a formation and a group at times.

References

Ordovician System of Europe
Lower Ordovician Series
Middle Ordovician Series
Geology of Wales